Adrian Paul Morley is an English former professional rugby league footballer who played as a  and  forward from the 1990s through the 2010s. A Great Britain and England international, he played for the Leeds Rhinos (with whom he won the 1999 Challenge Cup), Sydney Roosters (winning the 2002 NRL Premiership and 2003 World Club Challenge), Bradford Bulls (winning Super League X in 2005), Warrington Wolves (winning the 2009, 2010 and 2012 Challenge Cups) and the Salford Red Devils. With a reputation as a tough, uncompromising competitor, Morley was the first British player to win both NRL and Super League championships.

Playing career

Leeds
He played for Leeds between 1995 and 2000. He made his England and Great Britain débuts in 1996. In the 1997 post-season, Morley was selected to play for Great Britain in all three matches of the Super League Test series against Australia. He won the Challenge Cup with Leeds in 1999 when they defeated London Broncos 52–16 at Wembley. He was offered a chance to play alongside his brother Chris Morley, who played for Wales, but chose to commit to England in the 2000 World Cup. In July 2000, Morley agreed to join Australian side Sydney Roosters in the National Rugby League at the end of the season, who were being coached by former Leeds boss Graham Murray.

Warrington
Morley signed a 4-year deal with Warrington, beginning in 2006. He captained the Great Britain test side that faced France in 2007. He was also appointed captain of Warrington. It was while playing for Warrington that he made his 400th competitive senior appearance.

Morley was named in the 24-man England squad for the 2008 Rugby League World Cup, and also played against Wales at the Keepmoat Stadium, Doncaster prior to England's departure. In Group A's first match against Papua New Guinea he played from the interchange bench in England's victory.

Morley guided Warrington to Challenge Cup glory in 2009, beating Huddersfield in the final at Wembley. He was selected to play for England against France in the one-off test in 2010. 

Morley captained Warrington in the 2010 Challenge Cup Final victory over the Leeds Rhinos at Wembley Stadium.

Morley was to lead England in the 2010 Four Nations but was ruled out after injuring himself in a warm up match against the New Zealand Māori rugby league team.

Morley played for England in the 2011 Four Nations. England made the tournament's final and in the final, Morley made his 50th international appearance.

He played in the 2012 Challenge Cup Final victory over the Leeds Rhinos at Wembley Stadium.

He played in the 2012 Super League Grand Final defeat by the Leeds Rhinos at Old Trafford.

Morley's autobiography, "Moz", was released on 12 November 2012 and reprinted twice in the run up to Christmas 2012.

He played in the 2013 Super League Grand Final defeat by the Wigan Warriors at Old Trafford.

Salford
Morley signed a one-year deal for his hometown club Salford for the 2014 season, aiming to finish his career with his hometown club. The 36-year-old forward was appointed the Salford Red Devils' captain at the start of the 2014 season.

On 10 September 2015, Adrian announced that he would retire from playing rugby league at the end of the 2015 season.

On 14 October 2015, it was announced that Morley would play one more rugby league match. In his last match, he represented his début club, Leeds, in a one-off exhibition game against New Zealand.

References

External links
(archived by web.archive.org) Profile at warringtonwolves.com
(archived by web.archive.org) 2001 Ashes profile
(archived by web.archive.org) Article – Morley set for Footy Grand Slam
Morley to captain Great Britain
Ryles can overcome injury, and I should know: Morley
Morley hoping for Seventh Heaven – article at manchestereveningnews.co.uk
(archived by web.archive.org) Profile at leedsrugby

1977 births
Living people
Bradford Bulls players
England national rugby league team captains
England national rugby league team players
English rugby league players
Great Britain national rugby league team captains
Great Britain national rugby league team players
Leeds Rhinos players
Rugby league players from Salford
Rugby league props
Rugby league second-rows
Salford Red Devils captains
Salford Red Devils players
Sydney Roosters players
Warrington Wolves captains
Warrington Wolves players